Georgia Drummy (born 18 April 2000) is an Irish junior tennis player.

She has a career-high singles ranking by the WTA of 795, achieved on 12 August 2019. She has won two singles titles on tournaments of the ITF World Tour so far. 
 
Drummy has represented Ireland at the Fed Cup, where she has a win–loss record of 3–2.

On the junior tour, she has a career-high combined ranking of 35, achieved on 15 October 2018.

ITF Circuit finals

Singles: 3 (2 titles, 1 runner–up)

Doubles: 3 (3 runner-ups)

ITF Junior finals

Singles (6–3)

Doubles (10–5)

National representation

Fed Cup
Drummy made her Fed Cup debut for Ireland in 2016, while the team was competing in the Europe/Africa Zone Group III, when she was only 15 years old.

Fed Cup (3–2)

Singles (1–1)

Doubles (2–1)

External links
 
 
 

2000 births
Living people
Irish female tennis players
Tennis players from Dublin (city)
Tennis players at the 2018 Summer Youth Olympics
Duke Blue Devils women's tennis players